Galina Nikonorovna Yermolayeva ( Suslina, born 21 October 1948) is a Russian rower who competed for the Soviet Union in the 1976 Summer Olympics.

In 1976 she was a crew member of the Soviet boat which won the silver medal in the quadruple sculls event.

References

External links
 

1948 births
Living people
Russian female rowers
Soviet female rowers
Olympic rowers of the Soviet Union
Rowers at the 1976 Summer Olympics
Olympic silver medalists for the Soviet Union
Olympic medalists in rowing
World Rowing Championships medalists for the Soviet Union
Medalists at the 1976 Summer Olympics
European Rowing Championships medalists